Arthur James F. Bond, RSMA (29 April 1888 – 24 March 1958) was an English artist who worked in oils, watercolour and etching.

Life and work
Bond was born in 1888 in Devonport, Devon, England. His father, Richard Bond was the vicar of St James' Church, Devonport. When he was of age, Arthur was sent to a boarding school in Somerset.

After leaving school, Bond moved to London to concentrate on his artistic career, studying art at Heatherley's, at Goldsmiths College and at the Central School of Arts and Crafts. He first London address was in St Margarets-on-Thames, before moving to Twickenham in 1913, then Barnes, before settling in Richmond, in 1918. During the First World War, Bond served in the Royal Navy, mainly on the minelaying fleet operating from Harwich. Like many artists, London proved a muse for Bond which is evident in his numerous etchings and paintings of the city. Bond also favoured maritime subjects and was elected a member of the Royal Society of Marine Artists and the Wapping Group of Artists. He established a studio on Gravesend Pier in the same building used by Thames river pilots. During 1956, this pier-head studio became the setting for a number of Wapping Group invited meetings where members could chat to many of the pilots. Bond exhibited often in the capital, with six paintings shown at the Royal Academy between 1912 and 1918.

References

1888 births
1958 deaths
20th-century British printmakers
20th-century English painters
Alumni of the Heatherley School of Fine Art
English etchers
English male painters
Artists from Devonport, Plymouth
Royal Navy personnel of World War I
Alumni of Goldsmiths, University of London
20th-century English male artists